Karavomylos is a village and a community in the municipal unit of Sami, on the island of Cephalonia, Greece. Its population was 385 in 2011. It is situated on the coast, 2 km west of Sami, 6 km southeast of Agia Effimia and 15 km northeast of Argostoli.

Population

See also
List of settlements in Cephalonia

References

External links
Karavomylos at the GTP Travel Pages

Populated places in Cephalonia